Walerian is both a given name and a surname. Notable people with this given name include:

 Walerian Borowczyk (1923–2006), Polish film director
 Walerian Czuma (1890–1962), Polish general and military commander
 Walerian Kalinka (1826–1886), Polish priest and historian
 Walerian Łukasiński (1787–1868), Polish officer and political activist
 Walerian Kisieliński (1907–1988), Polish soccer forward
 Walerian Krasiński (1795–1855), Polish Calvinist politician, nationalist and historian
 Walerian Maryański (1875–1946), Polish sports shooter
 Walerian Pańko (1941–1991), Polish lawyer, and professor of legal science
 Walerian Przeniczka (1923–2015), Polish soldier, survived to the Soviet deportation to Siberia  
 Walerian Tewzadze (1894–1987), Georgian military officer

 Jerzy Walerian Braun (1911–1968), Polish rower
 Leon Walerian Ostroróg (1867–1932), Islamic scholar, jurist, adviser to the Ottoman government 

 Notable people with this surname include
 Mat Walerian, jazz saxophonist and woodwind player

See also 
 Valeri
 Valerian (name)

Masculine given names